The men's 420 competition at the 2002 Asian Games in Busan was held from 3 to 9 October 2002.

Schedule
All times are Korea Standard Time (UTC+09:00)

Results
Legend
DNF — Did not finish

References

2002 Asian Games Report, Page 572

External links
Results

Men's 420